The Governor of Murmansk Oblast is the head of the executive branch of government in Murmansk Oblast, in northwestern Russia. The position of governor under the current Charter of Murmansk Oblast was created in 1997. Until the adoption of the current charter, the head of Murmansk oblast was titled Head of the Murmansk Oblast Administration.

Governors of Murmansk Oblast

Elections

2019 
The latest election for the office was held on 8 September 2019.

2014 
The first election for the office after the countrywide restoration of direct gubernatorial elections was held on 14 September 2014.

 
Politics of Murmansk Oblast
Murmansk Oblast